Frank William Boreham OBE (3 March 1871, Tunbridge Wells, Kent, England – 18 May 1959, Melbourne, Victoria) was a Baptist preacher best known in New Zealand, Australia, and England.

Life and career
Boreham's birth coincided with the end of the Franco-Prussian War. He could say in later life, "Salvoes of artillery and peals of bells echoed across Europe on the morning of my birth." He was one of 10 children.

Boreham heard the great American preacher Dwight L. Moody during his youth. On another occasion he was badly injured and spent considerable time in hospital recovering, nursed by a Roman Catholic woman who widened his insight of ecumenism. 

Boreham became a Baptist preacher after conversion to Christianity while working in London. He was probably the last student interviewed by Charles Spurgeon for entry into his Pastor's College. After graduation, Boreham accepted a ministry at Mosgiel church, Dunedin, New Zealand, in March 1895 and there began his prolific writings, initially for the local newspaper. 

He later was a pastor in Hobart, Tasmania, and then on mainland Australia in Melbourne at Armadale and Kew. 

He notionally retired in 1928 at age 57, but continued to preach and write. During Billy Graham's evangelistic campaign in Australia in early 1959 Graham sought out Boreham for a discussion, due in great part to Boreham's widely read and respected writings.

Published works
Boreham wrote some 3,000 editorials that appeared weekly in the Hobart Mercury for 47 years between 1912 and 1959, and others in the Melbourne Age. He was calling on these works for yet another book, with one article for each day of the year, when he died. 

He published some 46 books with Epworth Press, the last The Tide Comes In in 1958, only months before his death. Many of these books received wide international acclaim. Most famous is his series of five books, published between 1920 and 1928, derived from the 125 sermons on the theme "Texts that Made History": A Bunch of Everlastings, A Handful of Stars, A Casket of Cameos, A Faggot of Torches, and A Temple of Topaz.

1891 Won to Glory (with foreword by F.B. Meyer)
1902 Loose Leaves (travelogue)
1903 From England to Mosgiel (travelogue)
1903 The Whisper of God (The Baptist Pulpit series)
1911 George Augustus Selwyn (biography)
1912 The Luggage of Life
1914 Mountains in the Mist
1915 The Golden Milestone
1915 Mushrooms on the Moor
1916 Faces in the Fire
1917 The Other Side of the Hill
1918 The Silver Shadow
1919 The Uttermost Star
1920 A Bunch of Everlastings
1920 A Reel of Rainbow
1921 The Home of the Echoes
1922 A Handful of Stars
1922 Shadows on the Wall
1923 Rubble and Roseleaves
1924 A Casket of Cameos
1924 Wisps of Wildfire
1925 The Crystal Pointers
1926 A Faggot of Torches
1926 A Tuft of Comet's Hair
1927 The Nest of Spears
1928 A Temple of Topaz
1928 The Fiery Crags
1929 The Three Half Moons
1930 The Blue Flame
1930 An Arch of Roses
1931 When the Swans Fly High
1932 A Witch's Brewing
1933 The bachelors of Mosgiel
1933 The Drums of Dawn
1934 The Ivory Spires
1935 The Heavenly Octave
1935 Ships of Pearl
1936 The Passing of John Broadbanks
1939 I Forgot to Say
1940 My Pilgrimage (autobiography)
1941 The Prodigal
1944 Boulevards of Paradise
1945 A Late Lark Singing
1948 Cliffs of Opal
1948 The Man Who Saved Gandhi (a short biography of J. J. Doke, republished in 2007 as Lover of Life)
1950 The Little Palace Beautiful
1951 Arrows of Desire
1953 My Christmas Book
1954 Dreams at Sunset
1954 In Pastures Green
1955 The Gospel of Robinson Crusoe
1956 The Gospel of Uncle Tom's Cabin
1958 The Tide Comes In
1961 The Last Milestone

Edited compilations:
Second Thoughts
The Chalice of Life

In 2016, nearly 50 years after Boreham's death, John Broadbanks Publishing published two volumes of previously unpublished material: Nuggets of Romance and Slices of Infinity. In addition, Pioneer Library and John Broadbanks Publishing are seeking to revive many of his out-of-print books.

Popular Culture
Steven James references Boreham several times in Synapse.

References

External links
'The Dr. F.W. Boreham Tribute Site'
'To be Frank - F. W. Boreham: The Public Theologian' by Geoff Pound
'So This is Boreham!' by Jeffrey S. Cranston
Review of 'Lover of Life'

Electronic editions
 
 
 
 

1871 births
1959 deaths
19th-century English Baptist ministers
20th-century Australian Baptist ministers
Australian Baptist theologians
Baptist writers
British emigrants to Australia
British expatriates in New Zealand
New Zealand Baptist ministers
Officers of the Order of the British Empire
People from Mosgiel
People from Royal Tunbridge Wells